Hemiphractus helioi is a species of frog in the family Hemiphractidae. It is found in the upper Amazon basin and lower Amazonian slopes of the Andes from Ecuador to southern Peru and into adjacent Brazil (Acre). There is also a disputed record from northern Bolivia. Prior to its formal description in 2001, it was confused with Hemiphractus johnsoni. Its natural habitats are primary tropical rainforest and montane cloud forest. It is an uncommon or even rare species, but no major threats have been identified; habitat loss can be a localized threat.

References

helioi
Amphibians of Brazil
Amphibians of Ecuador
Amphibians of Peru
Taxonomy articles created by Polbot
Amphibians described in 2001